A. juncea may refer to:

 Achatinella juncea, an extinct snail
 Aeshna juncea, a hawker dragonfly
 Ammophila juncea, a thread-waisted wasp
 Anisacanthus juncea, a desert honeysuckle
 Anomatheca juncea, a southeastern African plant
 Aphyllanthes juncea, a Mediterranean plant
 Arenaria juncea, a plant with swollen stem nodes
 Armeria juncea, a sea pink
 Artemisia juncea, a herbaceous plant